South Eliot is a census-designated place (CDP) in the town of Eliot in York County, Maine, United States. The population was 3,550 at the 2010 census. It is part of the Portland–South Portland–Biddeford, Maine Metropolitan Statistical Area.

Geography
South Eliot is located at  (43.114618, -70.795855).

According to the United States Census Bureau, the CDP has a total area of 7.6 square miles (19.7 km), of which 7.2 square miles (18.6 km) is land and 0.4 square miles (1.1 km), or 5.47%, is water.

Demographics

As of the census of 2000, there were 3,445 people, 1,386 households, and 988 families residing in the CDP. The racial makeup of the CDP was 98.46% White, 0.15% African American, 0.12% Native American, 0.49% Asian, 0.15% from other races, and 0.64% from two or more races. Hispanic or Latino of any race were 0.49% of the population.

There were 1,386 households, out of which 32.2% had children under the age of 18 living with them, 61.3% were married couples living together, 7.9% had a female householder with no husband present, and 28.7% were non-families. 22.9% of all households were made up of individuals, and 10.7% had someone living alone who was 65 years of age or older. The average household size was 2.49 and the average family size was 2.94.

In the CDP, the population was spread out, with 24.3% under the age of 18, 5.1% from 18 to 24, 28.9% from 25 to 44, 27.8% from 45 to 64, and 13.8% who were 65 years of age or older. The median age was 41 years. For every 100 females, there were 90.1 males. For every 100 females age 18 and over, there were 87.9 males.

The median income for a household in the CDP was $50,711, and the median income for a family was $64,402. Males had a median income of $41,513 versus $27,708 for females. The per capita income for the CDP was $25,431. About 6.1% of families and 6.8% of the population were below the poverty line, including 8.5% of those under age 18 and 3.3% of those age 65 or over.

References

Census-designated places in Maine
Portland metropolitan area, Maine
Census-designated places in York County, Maine